WQNU (103.1 FM, "New Country Q103.1") is a radio station broadcasting a country music format. Licensed to Lyndon, Kentucky, United States, the station serves the Louisville, Kentucky, area. The station is currently owned by SummitMedia.  The station's studios are located at Chestnut Centre in Downtown Louisville and the transmitter site is in Worthington Hills, Kentucky.

History
WSTM went on the air from St. Matthews in 1966. It was owned by J. W. Dunavent and sold four times in its first 10 years of broadcasting.

The station became WNUU on August 28, 1978.  On New Year's Day, 1980, the station changed its callsign to WRKA. It first aired an Adult Contemporary format but in 1982, the station became a short-lived Top 40 format until 1984, when it returned to its adult contemporary music format. Glenn Beck was their morning drive host at one point.  In January 1989, the station adopted an oldies format.
On  July 18, 2008, at 2:30 p.m., after playing The Beatles' Hello, Goodbye and a message from the station's program director going into a commercial break, the station aired a montage of station moments themed to American Pie  by Don McLean that ended on the lyric The day the music died, followed by one last jingle. After about a minute of static (through which the ending of Beginnings by Chicago could be faintly heard),  the station began stunting and introduced their "new" format as News/Talk 103.1 WRKA, complete with fake reports before having a fake "Breaking Fox News Alert" report of power outages around the state leading into the introduction of "New Country Q103.1" at 3 p.m., launching with Kid Rock's All Summer Long. The same day, they changed callsigns to the current WQNU.  The former WRKA callsign is now used on a sister station in the Louisville market.

On July 20, 2012, Cox Radio, Inc. announced the sale of WQNU and 22 other stations to Summit Media LLC for $66.25 million. The sale was consummated on May 3, 2013.

Notable alumni
Glenn Beck

Previous Logos

References

External links

FCC History Cards for WQNU
Footage of WRKA changing formats

QNU
Country radio stations in the United States
Radio stations established in 1978
1978 establishments in Kentucky
Lyndon, Kentucky